Jython is an implementation of the Python programming language designed to run on the Java platform. The implementation was formerly known as JPython until 1999.

Overview
Jython programs can import and use any Java class. Except for some standard modules, Jython programs use Java classes instead of Python modules. Jython includes almost all of the modules in the standard Python programming language distribution, lacking only some of the modules implemented originally in C. For example, a user interface in Jython could be written with Swing, AWT or SWT. Jython compiles Python source code to Java bytecode (an intermediate language) either on demand or statically.

History
Jython was initially created in late 1997 to replace C with Java for performance-intensive code accessed by Python programs, moving to SourceForge in October 2000. The Python Software Foundation awarded a grant in January 2005.  Jython 2.5 was released in June 2009.

Status and roadmap
The most recent release is Jython 2.7.2. It was released on 21 March 2020 and is compatible with Python 2.7.

Python 3 compatible changes are planned in Jython 3 Roadmap.  

Although Jython implements the Python language specification, it has some differences and incompatibilities with CPython, which is the reference implementation of Python.

License terms
From version 2.2 on, Jython (including the standard library) is released under the Python Software Foundation License (v2). Older versions are covered by the Jython 2.0, 2.1 license and the JPython 1.1.x Software License.

The command line interpreter is available under the Apache Software License.

Usage
 JBoss Application Server's command line interface scripting using Jython
 Oracle Weblogic Server Scripting Tool uses Jython
 IBM Rational development tools allow Jython scripting
 IBM WebSphere Application Server tool scripting with wsadmin allows using Jython and Jacl
 ZK – a Java Ajax framework that allows glue logic written in Jython
Ignition - A software development platform focused on HMI and SCADA
Ghidra - a reverse engineering tool developed by the NSA allows plugins to be written in Java or Jython
 openHAB - home automation software

See also

 List of Java scripting languages
 IronPython – an implementation of Python for .NET and Mono
 PyPy – a self-hosting interpreter for the Python programming language.
 JRuby – similar project for the Ruby programming language.
 GraalVM - a polyglot runtime written in Java, has a Python 3 implementation

References

External links
 

JVM programming languages
Object-oriented programming languages
Python (programming language) implementations
Scripting languages
Software using the PSF license